Reductoderces illustris is a moth of the Psychidae family. It was described by Philpott in 1917. It is found in New Zealand.

References

 Reductoderces illustris in species id

Moths described in 1917
Moths of New Zealand
Psychidae